Annamaria Mazzetti (born 25 August 1988 in Magenta, Lombardy, Provincia di Milano) is an Italian professional triathlete and 2009 National Champion in three categories (Duathlon Sprint, Triathlon Sprint, Olympic Distance).

In 2007, Mazzetti won the Italian Championships in all Junior categories (Aquathlon, Duathlon, Triathlon), in 2008 she won the gold medal at the Italian U23 Championships.  In 2010, she won the bronze medal at the European U23 Championships and in Italy she was considered one of the most promising Olympic hopes for London 2012.

In Italy, like Daniela Chmet, Mazzetti represents the Police Club GS Fiamme Oro, after she had been a member of the Friesian Team, and lives in Cesate.

She competed in the women's event at the 2012 and 2016 Summer Olympics, finishing in 46th and 29th place respectively.

ITU Competitions 
In the seven years from 2004 to 2010, Mazzetti took part in 30 ITU competitions and achieved 19 top ten positions.
In 2011, Mazzetti won the bronze medal at the European Championships. Apart from Nadia Cortassa, Mazzetti is the first Italian triathlete to win a medal at European Championships.
The following list is based upon the official ITU rankings and the ITU Athletes's Profile Page.
Unless indicated otherwise, the following events are triathlons (Olympic Distance) and refer to the Elite category.

References

External links 
 Profile Page / Italian Triathlon Federation in Italian

1988 births
Living people
People from Magenta, Lombardy
Italian female triathletes
Olympic triathletes of Italy
Triathletes at the 2012 Summer Olympics
Triathletes at the 2016 Summer Olympics
Triathletes of Fiamme Oro
Sportspeople from the Metropolitan City of Milan
20th-century Italian women
21st-century Italian women